Adewale Sunday Amusan (born 12 June 1989 in Makurdi) is a Nigerian football player who currently plays for Wikki Tourists F.C. He has previously played in Slovenia.

Career
He began his career by Lobi Stars F.C., than joined on 2 September 2007 for 140.000 € on loan to FC Koper, after 18 months turned back to Lobi Stars F.C. He signed than on 7 February 2009 with FC Unirea Urziceni, he comes on loan from Lobi Stars, he played his debut for his new team in a friendly game against FC Shakhtar Donetsk on 25 January 2009 and turned in July 2009 back to Lobi Stars. He signed in summer 2010 for Macedonian Macedonian First League side FK Rabotnički before returned in May 2012 to Wikki Tourists F.C.

References

External sources
 Profile and stats from Slovenia at PrvaLiga 

1989 births
Living people
People from Makurdi
Nigerian footballers
Yoruba sportspeople
Association football midfielders
Lobi Stars F.C. players
Slovenian PrvaLiga players
FC Koper players
Nigerian expatriates in Slovenia
Expatriate footballers in Slovenia
Liga I players
Nigerian expatriate sportspeople in Romania
Expatriate footballers in Romania
FK Rabotnički players
Expatriate footballers in North Macedonia